Ernesto Silva (born 4 May 1921) was a Chilean equestrian. He competed in two events at the 1952 Summer Olympics.

References

External links
  

1921 births
Possibly living people
Chilean male equestrians
Chilean dressage riders
Olympic equestrians of Chile
Equestrians at the 1952 Summer Olympics
Pan American Games medalists in equestrian
Pan American Games gold medalists for Chile
Equestrians at the 1951 Pan American Games
Place of birth missing (living people)
Medalists at the 1951 Pan American Games
20th-century Chilean people